Ślepowron is a Polish coat of arms. It was used by several szlachta families in the times of the Polish–Lithuanian Commonwealth. From the fifteenth century, the descendants of the Ślepowron family began to use names taken from their lands. This led to many different surnames being created within one family. The Ślepowron coat of arms is unique in Polish heraldry, in that it is the only coat of arms which is indicative a common origin of individual families, that is, the de Ślepowron, or Korwin, family. Wawrzęta Korwin de Ślepowron is the oldest known ancestor of the family, although the family's oral traditions claim that they descend from Marcus Valerius Corvus, a Roman general.

Blazon

A black raven with its wings somewhat extended for flight, is facing to the right of the shield. It stands atop a cross. 
The cross is on the shoulders of a horseshoe which stands erect with its heels at the bottom. 
The raven holds a gold ring in its beak.

The shield is blue and the horseshoe silver. On a crowned helmet stands a raven similar to the one in the shield.

History

Adding the Horseshoe to the Raven

Baroque writers agree on a rather romantic version of how this clan shield was acquired in its present form: When a handsome knight from one of the Korwin families had the good fortune to marry a beautiful daughter of the Pobog clan, he redesigned the arms by adding to The Horseshoe and cross of his bride's coat of arms to his own ancestral Raven with A Ring.

The Ślepowron coat of arms are seen as an earlier version of the Korwin coat of arms, which many families decided to adopt as a more 'fashionable' crest.

Origin of the name Ślepowron

The name Ślepowron is said to be taken from the village of Ślepowrony near Płońsk, Mazowsze, which belonged to the then-established Korwin-Piotrowski family. This village (according to the important work "Herbów Rycerstwa Polskiego", by Bartosz Paprocki) was to be kept by the knight Wawrzęta de Ślepowrony, at the service of Fr. Konrad Mazowiecki.

Motto
“Kości spròchniałe powstańcie z mogiły, 
Przywdziejcie ducha i ciało i siły' - 
Woronicz (found in Herbarz Polski, Hipolit Stupnicki)

Origin of the Raven

The Raven symbol itself is much older, and for its origin there are many legends whose veracity is often doubtful. These are nearly the same for Slepowron and Korwin and for the Korwin coat of arms has a similar raven, but standing on a log rather than on a horseshoe.

Sarmatian Totem
For some reason, an old Polish aristocratic clan, of Sarmatian origin, chose the Raven as its symbol – possibly as its "Rodnidze", the "Totem-spirit of the Clan".

Such clans, pagans at the time, far predated the conversion of Poland to Christianity and the rise of the Piast Dynasty's kingdom.

The 1224 Grant

Many centuries later, a raven is attested in a grant of privilege to Warzęta Korwin z Ślepowrony, from Duke Konrad I of Masovia, given at Warsaw in 1224.

The "Roman-Hungarian legend"

The actual Korwin shield, with the ring in the raven's beak, came to Poland from Hungary, almost two centuries later, via the so-called Roman-Hungarian legend -  under the influence of ancient culture and vivid contacts between members of the Polish nobility and the Hungarian Royal Court.

The Roman Part

According to ancient Roman sources, a distinguished  tribune named Marcus Valerius Corvus born 370BC, of the Roman Gens Valerii, had while on the battlefield in 349BC, accepted a challenge to single combat issued to the Romans by a barbarian warrior of great size and strength.

Suddenly, a raven flew from a trunk, perched upon Valerius' helmet, and began to attack his foe's eyes with its beak so fiercely that the barbarian was blinded, and the Roman beat him easily. In memory of this event, Valerius got the agnomen Corvinus (from Corvus, "Raven"). Marcus Valerius Messalla Corvinus (64BC-8AD) was selected to be Caesar Augustus' colleague in the consulate.

The Hungarian/Polish Part

In the Kingdom of Hungary, the Wallachian-Hungarian family of Korvin had flourished since the 15th century. They claimed descent from Valerious - who, according to the interpretation of Baroque authors, became a big landowner on the Dacian-Pannonian frontiers, the future Hungary - which is of very doubtful veracity.

It is true that Janos Hunyadi and his son, Matthias Corvinus Hunyadi, King of Hungary and Bohemia, called themselves "Corvinus" and had their coins minted displaying a "raven with a ring".

The epithet Corvinus was coined by Matthias' biographer, the Italian Antonio Bonfini, who claimed that the Hunyadi family descended from Marcus Valerius Corvinus. This connection, spurious or not, was later taken over by the Polish aristocrats connected with the Hungarian family. 

History of the distinguished Medonich family is interwoven within the majestic tapestry of Hungary and her people, which has produced some of the most illustrious family names that the world has ever known. It is from this rich cultural heritage of the Hungarian peoples traditions of strong powerful warrior princes like Attila the Hun and the Magyar Prince, Arpad, that the surname Medonich originates. the house of Medonich anciently held their territories in the Moldavian region of eastern Hungary. The broad Danube River divides Hungary down the middle. To the east of the river is a vast flat area called the Great Alf ld, and thence the great forests of Transylvania and Moldavia where the Medonich family were first recorded. The Great Plain is the most typically Magyar region of the Carpathian basin. Arpad's Magyars settled here in the Great Plain first and then in Transylvania and Moldavian The Romans in Pannonia were eventually forced to build forts to protect themselves but they were not able to extend their empires into what is now eastern Hungary. The family name Medonich was found to be descended from the founding Magyar race, a strong and proud race of warriors, farmers and horsemen who survived against the continued incursion of the Turks seeking to gain their and proud beautiful homeland. By the 11th century the Magyars had converted to Christianity and saw waves of Crusaders and heated battles over the next centuries in 1221 the issuance of the Golden Bull by King Andras II gave rights of self-determination to the nobles and gentry at the national council and it is here that the Medonich family on the document of attendance. During this period of trans the Medonich family ware found in along the border of the Transylvanian/Moldavian border where the Medonich family held their lands and estates as nobles and feudal lords from very early on. Family tradition has it that they trace their ancient descent from a famous warrior who defended and extended his territories marrying a princess from a neighboring region Konrada Mazowieckiego appeared as a powerful noble warrior who established the Slepowron, Stracchowa, Drozkzion and Wola tribes in the far reaching territories in 1224. His descendants through his son Korwin or Corwins were nobles in the north of Italy in the west. As a noble ancient family of distinction with the powerful royal Slepowron and Drozkzino Latvia in the north and south into Slavonia. One member of the Medonich family appeared at the Prussian court in 1414 acting as a representative for his territories and people in Galacia; and another appeared at Dobryczn in 1674. Members of this small but important family are also recorded in the annals for their valiant service for king, country and faith over the centuries. Notable figures of the time bearing the Medonich name were the house of Medonich of Moldavia, Transylvania, Austria, Yugoslavia, Croatia, Greece, Italy and the U.S.A.

King Matthias's Ring

In addition to the above, the Silesian Annals tell that a raven carried off the ring which King Matthias, (who was also ruler of the Duchy of Głogów, and Suzerain of all the Silesian duchies), had removed from his finger. Matthias chased the bird down and slew it, retrieving the ring - and in commemoration of this event, he took the Raven as a symbol for his signet sign.

Arms derivatives of Ślepowron, alternative drawings and entitled family versions

 Tadeusz Gajl identifies 29 coats of arms derivatives of Ślepowron:
Gosiewski, surname Gosiewski. (Is uncertain if it is derivative of Korwin or Ślepowron).
Jurzyc, surnames Jurzyc, Jurzyk.
Kamecki, surname Kamecki.
Kamieński, surname Kamieński.
Kossakowski Count, surname Kossakowski.
 Krakowski Count, surname Krakowski.
Krasiński Count 1, surname Krasiński.
Krasiński Count 2, surname Krasiński.
Krasiński Count 3, surname Krasiński.
Kurkowski, surname Kurkowski.
Leśniewski, surname Leśniewski.
Lisowski, surname Lisowski also Lissowski.
Luberadzki, surname Luberadzki.
Lutostański, surname Lutostański
Mieroszewski Count, surname Mieroszewski.
Milan, surnames Milewski, Zaorski.
Milewski Count, surname Milewski.
Nachtraba, surnames Nachtrab, Nachtraba.
Olszweski IV, surname Olszewski.
Olszewski V, surname Olszewski.
Pawłowski Count, surname Pawłowski.
Rabe, surname Rabe.
Pokrzywnicki, surname Pokrzywnicki.
Rosyniec, surnames Górka, Rosiński, Rosyniec.
Sobobliński, surname Sobobliński.
Sobolewski Count, surname Sobolewski.
Suchodolski II, surname Suchodolski.
Szlubowski Count, surname Szlubowski.
Wróblewski, surname Wróblewski.
Wykisiały, surname Wykisiały.

 Coats of arms related to Ślepowron on other way.
Some coats of arms may be related to Ślepowron, yet they are not classified as Derivatives properly, on Polish armorials: 
Czarnowron, surnames Borowicz, Fijałkowski.
Kurowski, surname Kurowski.
Raszyniec, surnames Maciuk, Maczuk.
Sandrecki, surnames Sandrecki, Sendraszyc.
Siedmiogradzki, surname Siedmiogradzki.
Zasulicz, surname Zasulicz.
Żukowski surnames Kowalewski, Żuchowski, Żuczenko, Żuk, Żukowski.

Notable bearers

Notable bearers of this coat of arms include:
 Augustyn Kordecki
 Gabriel Rzączyński (1664–1737), Polish Jesuit priest and writer
 Kazimierz Pułaski
 Panteleimon Kulish (1819–1897) — Ukrainian writer, critic, poet, folklorist, and translator;
 Pavlo Teteria (1620s–1670) — Hetman of Right-bank Ukraine (1663–1665);
 Ignacy Mościcki President of Poland (1926–1939)
 Wojciech Jaruzelski President of Poland (1989–1990)
 Tadeusz Kłopotowski Senator of Poland (1989-1991)
 Szymon Marcin Kossakowski
 Wincenty Krasiński (in France: comte Vincent Corvin-Krasinski)
 Kazimierz Krasiński
 Zygmunt Krasiński
 Tadeusz Gosiewski
 Grzegorz Skwierczyński
 Przemysław Skwirczyński
 Karol Szymanowski
 Henryk Lowmianski
 Chris Korwin-Kuczynski (21st century) Canadian politician
 Przemysław Gosiewski Deputy Prime Minister of Poland (2007)
 Łukasz Leończuk (1993) 
 Otto von Corvin-Wierzbicki (in Germany Otto von Corvin also Otto von Corvin-Wierzbitzky)
 Walenty Nasierowski (1802-1888)

Related and Derivative coats of arms 
 Korwin coat of arms
 Czarnowron coat of arms
 Kurowski coat of arms
 Materna coat of arms
 Sandrecki coat of arms

See also

 Polish heraldry
 Heraldry
 List of Polish nobility coats of arms

External links 
 Herbarz Polski - Od Średniowiecza do XX wieku (Tadeusz Gajl) in English and Polish.
 Genealogia Dynastyczna/Dynastic Genealogy (Ryszard Jurzak) in English and Polish.
 Słownik genealogiczny - leksykon (Marcin Niewalda - redaktor naczelny) in Polish.
 Ornatowski.com (Artur Ornatowski) in Polish
- Herby szlacheckie Rzeczypospolitej Obojga Narodów (Tadeusz Gajl)
- Herbarz rodowy (Alfred Znamierowski)
- Szlachta wylegitymowana w Królestwie Polskim w latach 1836-1861(1867), (Elżbieta Sęczys)
- Ornatowski.com – Rodziny (Artur Ornatowski)
 Wykaz Rodów Szlacheckich (Andrzej Brzezina Winiarski) in Polish.
 Chrząński: Tablice odmian herbowich, tablica XXII - Mały herbarz Adama Kromera i przyjaciół (Adam Kromer) in Polish.
 Mały Herbarz (Hetmani wielcy litewscy) Adama Kromera . in Polish
 Mały Herbarz (Hetmani polni litewscy) Adama Kromera . in Polish
 Mały Herbarz (Podskarbowie wielcy koronni) Adama Kromera. in Polish
 Aleksander Gosiewski and Wincenty Gosiewski (Marcin Gosiewski). in English and Polish.
 Roman family genealogy (Michael Roman). in English
  Slepowron Coat of Arms and bearers. 
 Strona Krassowskich herbu Ślepowron in Polish
 "Wróblewscy herbu Ślepwron" in Polish
 Confederation of the Polish Nobility – List of Members in Polish and English
 Nasierowscy herbu Ślepowron in Polish
 The Lyczkowskis of Slepowron Shield

References 

Polish coats of arms